Preetish Nijhawan is an entrepreneur known for co-founding the internet company Akamai Technologies in 1998.

Early life
Nijhawan studied at Hyderabad Public School, then received a Bachelor of Science degree from BITS, Pilani, a master's degree from the University of Southern California and an MBA from the MIT Sloan School of Management.

Career
Before joining NeoEdge, Nijhawan was a Vice President at BMC Software and prior to that he was a co-founder and Vice President at iVita Corporation, and was a consultant for McKinsey & Company. Earlier in his career he also spent 6 years at Intel Corporation in engineering and management roles.

Preetish is now Managing Director and co-founder of Cervin Ventures, a Venture Capital firm that invests in very early-stage software companies. Nijhawan now works for a group of companies (JME Software, Scalable Software and Neon Enterprise Software) as CFO.  Prior to this, Nijhawan worked with NeoEdge Networks in Palo Alto, California as Vice President of Strategic Alliances where he led the development of the company's most important partnerships and distribution relationships.

Nijhawan is also the co-founder of local coffee shop "The Coffee Groundz" in the Midtown area of Houston, Texas.

References

External links
 Mckinsey Alumni news
 NeoEdge Networks Press Release
 JME Software web site
 Cervin Ventures web site

American people of Telugu descent
University of Southern California alumni
MIT Sloan School of Management alumni
Living people
Year of birth missing (living people)
Akamai Technologies people